The 135th Armored Cavalry Division "Ariete" (colloquially also known as "135th Armored Division "Ariete II") was an armored division of the Royal Italian Army during World War II. It was formed in 1943 and named to commemorate the 132nd Armored Division "Ariete", which had distinguished itself during the Western Desert campaign and was destroyed during the Second Battle of El Alamein. After the announcement of the Armistice of Cassibile on 8 September 1943 the division fought the invading German forces South of Rome. After two days the division was forced to surrender and was disbanded by the Germans on 12 September 1943.

History 

The 132nd Armored Division "Ariete" had been formed in Milan in February 1939 and been sent to Libya in 1941. The division participated in all battles of the Western Desert campaign until it fought to annihilation during the Second Battle of El Alamein. On 21 November 1942 the remnants of the 132nd Armored Division "Ariete" were combined with the remnants of the 133rd Armored Division "Littorio" and 101st Motorized Division "Trieste" as Tactical Group "Ariete". The Tactical Group fought a successful rearguard action at El Agheila, but was soon afterwards disbanded. On 8 December 1943 the Ariete division was officially declared lost.

On 1 April 1943 the 135th Armored Cavalry Division "Ariete" was activated in Ferrara. The division was made up of cavalry regiments and General Raffaele Cadorna, the commander of the army's Cavalry Application School, became the division's first (and only) commander. The division remained in the Emilia region until it moved to Rome in August 1943 in the wake of the fall of the fascist regime of Benito Mussolini on 26 July 1943.

The division was assigned to the Motorized-Armored Army Corps and tasked with defense of the northern approaches to Rome on both sides of Lake Bracciano in the towns of Monterosi and Manziana. On 8 September 1943, when the Armistice of Cassibile was announced, the division's strength was 8,500 men, with 176 working tanks and armored vehicles, about 70 cannons and 92 20mm anti-aircraft guns.

On 9 September 1943 the division successfully blocked the advance of the German 3rd Panzergrenadier Division and elements of the 26th Panzer Division. In Monterosi the German vanguard was blocked by the division's mixed engineer battalion, which was supported by the Regiment "Cavalleggeri di Lucca" and the III Group of the 135th Artillery Regiment with 149/19 Mod. 37 howitzers. After the flight of the Italian King Victor Emmanuel III and his government from Rome the division was ordered on 10 September to move to Tivoli and abandon the defense of Rome. Cadorna did as ordered, but dispatched the lancers of the Regiment "Lancieri di Montebello" to the South of Rome to assist the 12th Infantry Division "Sassari" and 21st Infantry Division "Granatieri di Sardegna" in the defense of the city. The lancers under General Dardano Fenulli arrived in time to fight in the Battle of Porta Pia against the German 2. Fallschirmjäger-Division. In the late afternoon the Italian units defending Rome were told that an agreement with the Germans had been reached and ordered to surrender.

The next day, on 11 September 1943, the division's commander General Cadorna went into hiding and joined the resistance in Rome, the Clandestine Military Front of Colonel Giuseppe Cordero Lanza di Montezemolo. On 12 September 1943 the 135th Armored Cavalry Division "Ariete" was officially dissolved.

Organization 
During its existence the division continuously underwent changes to its organization. As the army's premier armored unit the division received the newest tanks and self-propelled guns as they came of the production lines and in turn ceded older equipment to other units. The list below is the best sourced table of organization and equipment of the division on 8 September 1943 available:

 135th Armored Cavalry Division "Ariete"
 Armored Reconnaissance Grouping "Lancieri di Montebello" (8th)
 Command Squadron (included 4x 20/65 anti-aircraft guns)
 I group
 Command Squadron (4x AB41 armored cars)
 1st Squadron (17x AB41 armored cars)
 2nd Squadron (17x AB41 armored cars)
 3rd Motorcyclists Squadron
 II group
 Command Squadron (4x Semovente 47/32 L40 self-propelled guns)
 4th Motorcyclists Squadron
 5th Squadron (12x Semovente 75/18 M42 self-propelled guns)
 6th Squadron (12x Semovente 47/32 L40 self-propelled guns)
 III group
 Command Squadron (4x M15/42 tanks)
 7th Squadron (17x M15/42 tanks)
 8th Squadron (16x L6/40 tanks)
 9th Anti-aircraft Squadron (12x 20/65 Mod. 35 anti-aircraft guns)
 Armored Regiment "Lancieri Vittorio Emanuele II" (10th)
 Command Squadron (included 4x 20/65 anti-aircraft guns)
 Anti-aircraft Squadron (12x 20/65 Mod. 35 anti-aircraft guns)
 Recovery and Repairs Squadron
 66th Heavy Mobile Workshop
 3x Tank groups
 each group with 3x squadrons (10x Semovente 75/18 M42 and 7x M15/42 tanks tanks per squadron)
 Motorized Regiment "Cavalleggeri di Lucca" (16th)
 Command Squadron (included 4x 20/65 anti-aircraft guns)
 Motorcyclists Squadron (included 4x AB41 armored cars)
 Self-propelled Squadron (12x 75/18 self-propelled guns)
 Transport Unit
 3x Dismounted groups
 2x truck-transported squadrons
 Support Weapons and Anti-aircraft Squadron (4x 75/18 self-propelled guns and 4x 20/65 anti-aircraft guns)
 Mortar Squadron (9x 81mm Mod. 35 mortars)
 135th Motorized Artillery Regiment
 Command Unit
 I Group (12x 100/22 field guns)
 II Group (12x 100/22 field gun)
 CLIX Group (12x 149/19 howitzers)
 DXXI Anti-aircraft Group (12x 90/53 anti-aircraft guns)
 235th Self-propelled and Anti-tank Artillery Regiment
 Command Unit
 XX Anti-tank Artillery Group (12x 75/32 anti-tank guns)
 XXI Anti-tank Group (12x 75/32 anti-tank guns)
 DCI Self-propelled Group (12x Semovente 105/25 M43 self-propelled guns)
 DCII Self-propelled Group (12x Semovente 105/25 M43 self-propelled guns)
 CXXXV Self-propelled Anti-tank Battalion (12x Semovente 75/34 M42 self-propelled guns)
 CXXXV Mixed Engineer Battalion
 X Recruits Training Group
 135th Medical Section
 135th Supply Section
 134th Transport Section
 169th Carabinieri Section
 160th Field Post Office

Commanding officers 
The division's commanding officers were:

 Generale di Brigata Raffaele Cadorna (1 April 1943 - 12 September 1943)

References 

 

Divisions of Italy in World War II
Armored divisions of Italy
Military units and formations established in 1943
Military units and formations disestablished in 1943
1943 establishments in Italy
1943 disestablishments in Italy

it:135ª Divisione cavalleria corazzata "Ariete"